In enzymology, a xanthine phosphoribosyltransferase is an enzyme that catalyzes the chemical reaction

XMP + diphosphate  5-phospho-alpha-D-ribose 1-diphosphate + xanthine

Thus, the two substrates of this enzyme are XMP and diphosphate, whereas its two products are 5-phospho-alpha-D-ribose 1-diphosphate and xanthine.

This enzyme belongs to the family of glycosyltransferases, specifically the pentosyltransferases.  The systematic name of this enzyme class is XMP:diphosphate 5-phospho-alpha-D-ribosyltransferase. Other names in common use include Xan phosphoribosyltransferase, xanthosine 5'-phosphate pyrophosphorylase, xanthylate pyrophosphorylase, xanthylic pyrophosphorylase, XMP pyrophosphorylase, 5-phospho-alpha-D-ribose-1-diphosphate:xanthine, phospho-D-ribosyltransferase, 9-(5-phospho-beta-D-ribosyl)xanthine:diphosphate, and 5-phospho-alpha-D-ribosyltransferase.  This enzyme participates in purine metabolism.

Structural studies

References

 

EC 2.4.2
Enzymes of known structure